Zapoteca is a genus of flowering plants in the family Fabaceae, in the mimosoid clade of the subfamily Caesalpinioideae. It was separated from the genus Calliandra in 1986 on the basis of chromosome numbers, pollen, seedling structure, and other features. It is named in honour of the Zapotec peoples.

Species
Species include:
Zapoteca aculeata (Benth.) H.M.Hern.
Zapoteca alinae H.M.Hern.
Zapoteca amazonica (Benth.) H.M.Hern.
Zapoteca andina H.M.Hern.
Zapoteca caracasana (Jacq.) H.M.Hern.
Zapoteca costaricensis (Britton & Rose) H.M.Hern.
Zapoteca filipes (Benth.) H.M.Hern.
Zapoteca formosa (Kunth) H.M.Hern.
Zapoteca gracilis (Griseb.) Bassler
Zapoteca lambertiana (G.Don) H.M.Hern.
Zapoteca media (M.Martens & Galeotti) H.M.Hern
Zapoteca microcephala (Britton & Killip) H.M.Hern.
Zapoteca mollis (Standl.) H.M.Hern.
Zapoteca nervosa (Urb.) H.M.Hern.
Zapoteca portoricensis (Jacq.) H.M.Hern.
 Zapoteca portoricensis subsp. portoricensis (Jacq.) H.M.Hern.
Zapoteca quichoi H.M. Hern. & Hanan-Alipi
Zapoteca ravenii H.M.Hern.
Zapoteca scutellifera (Benth.) H.M.Hern.
Zapoteca sousae H.M. Hern. & A. Campos V.
Zapoteca tehuana H.M.Hern.
Zapoteca tetragona (Willd.) H.M.Hern.

References

External links

 
Fabaceae genera